Stockport Metropolitan Borough Council is the local authority for the Metropolitan Borough of Stockport, Greater Manchester, England. The council is currently run by a Liberal Democrat minority administration. At the 2022 local elections, the Liberal Democrats gained two more seats, increasing their lead over the Labour Party to three seats, and took control of the council at the following full council meeting. The Liberal Democrats currently have 28 seats, Labour 24, Conservatives 4, Heald Green Ratepayers 3, and Greens 2.

There are now four Independent councillors. Matt Wynne resigned to sit as an independent following what he called moves by the hard left to deselect him for the 2023 elections. Councillor Alanna Vine was expelled from the Conservative Party following an investigation into racist tweets. Amanda Peers and Andy Sorton (both Brinnington & Central) resigned from the Labour group in February 2023.

History
Stockport became incorporated in 1835 under the Municipal Corporations Act 1835. In 1888, the County Borough of Stockport was created under the Local Government Act 1888. The Borough would be enlarged in 1901 and 1903, absorbing urban districts such as Reddish and Heaton Norris from the counties of Lancashire and Cheshire.

The Local Government Act 1972 would abolish this county borough, creating the Metropolitan Borough of Stockport within Greater Manchester.

Wards and councillors
There are 21 wards, each represented by three councillors.

Structure
Stockport Metropolitan Borough Council (Stockport Council) uses a Leader and cabinet system. There are eight cabinet members, including the leader of the council; each has a separate portfolio containing responsibilities for different services and areas of the council. There are also six scrutiny committees which scrutinise decisions made by the cabinet.

Cabinet
The Cabinet of the Council consists of eight Councillors:

 Leader of the Council: Mark Hunter
 Children, Families and Education: Wendy Meikle (Deputy Cabinet Leader)
 Finance and Resources: Malcolm Allan
 Climate Change and Environment: Mark Roberts
 Highways, Parks and Leisure Services: Grace Baynham
 Economy & Regeneration: Colin MacAlister
 Communities and Housing: Helen Foster-Grime
 Health and Adult Social Care: Keith Holloway

Politics

Stockport Council has 63 elected members, belonging to five different parties. The Liberal Democrats have 28 seats, Labour 24, Conservatives four, Heald Green Ratepayers three, Greens two, and there are two independent councillors. No party has overall control: the council is led by a Liberal Democrat minority administration. 

In the 2004 election, all councillors on the council were put up for election at the same time. This election was conducted exclusively by postal voting. Each elector was given three votes, and asked to pick three candidates. The number of votes each candidate received then determined when they would next stand for election.

Elections were then scheduled for 2006, 2007, and 2008.

In the council elections on Thursday 1 May 2008, in which one third of the seats were up for re-election, there were two main changes. In the Cheadle & Gatley ward, incumbent councillor Paul Carter of the Liberal Democrat party lost his seat to the Conservative candidate Mick Jones. Similarly in the Brinnington and Central Ward, Labour councillor Maureen Rowles lost her seat to the Liberal Democrat candidate Christian Walker. However, a short time after this election, he chose to serve as an Independent Councillor, then returned to the Liberal Democrats, then declared himself Independent again.

During 2009, which was supposed to be a "fallow year" (one without elections), there were three by-elections following the deaths of serving councillors. Subsequently, Labour councillor Anne Graham joined the Liberal Democrat group, bringing them to 36 Councillors of 63.

On 2 February 2011, Councillors David White, Roy Driver and Anne Graham all resigned from the Liberal Democrat Group. All three cited unhappiness with the national party's involvement with a "Tory-led" government.  They became Independent Left Councillors, forming the Independent Left Group on the Council, whilst awaiting the result of membership applications to the Labour Party and subsequently joined the Labour Group after the 2011 elections. Roy Driver was not selected for a seat in the May 2011 and unsuccessfully contested Bredbury and Woodley for Labour in May 2012. He was eventually elected councillor for Reddish North in 2015.

On 21 January 2012, Patrick McAuley, Labour councillor for Manor since May 2011, announced on Twitter that he had resigned from the Labour Party but that would continue to serve as a councillor; he subsequently joined the Liberal Democrat group in December 2012, but quit in April 2016, a month after being re-elected.

In October and November 2014, Stockport Labour lost 3 seats with Brian Hendley, Paul Moss and Laura Booth all leaving the party. Hendley was deselected without his knowing, Moss resigned due to house building on Reddish Vale Country Park and Booth quit over allegations of a "culture of systematic bullying".

Heald Green Ratepayers are the only non-mainstream candidates to win seats.

Following the 2022 Local Elections, the Liberal Democrats became the largest group on the council and Mark Hunter became leader.

References

External links
Official website

Local government in the Metropolitan Borough of Stockport
Metropolitan district councils of England
Local authorities in Greater Manchester
Local education authorities in England
Billing authorities in England
Leader and cabinet executives
1974 establishments in England